Papilio helenus, the red Helen, is a large swallowtail butterfly found in forests of southern India and parts of southeast Asia.

Range
Papilio helenus is rarely found in Sri Lanka, southern and north-east India, Nepal, Bhutan, Bangladesh, Myanmar, Thailand, Laos, Kampuchea, Vietnam, southern China (including Hainan, Guangdong province), Taiwan, southern Japan, South Korea, Ryukyu Islands, peninsular and eastern Malaysia, Brunei, Philippines, and Indonesia (Sumatra, Java, Bangka, Kalimantan, the Lesser Sunda Islands except Tanimbar).

In India it occurs along the Western Ghats from Kerala to Gujarat, also Palnis and Shevaroys, in the north from Mussoorie eastwards, to north-east India and onto Myanmar.

Description

Status
Papilio helenus is generally uncommon and slightly threatened ( in certain places) . It is very commonly found Maharashtra, but also rarely in Gujarat and parts of Kerala. Its history can be traced back to Assam and Western Ghats, where it is currently endemic.

Taxonomy

Species group
Papilio helenus is the nominate member of the helenus species group. The members of this clade are:
Papilio helenus Linnaeus, 1758
Papilio iswara White, 1842
Papilio iswaroides Fruhstorfer, 1898
Papilio nephelus Boisduval, 1836
Papilio nubilus Staudinger, 1895
Papilio sataspes C. & R. Felder, 1865

Subspecies
There are up to thirteen different subspecies, two of which occur in India:
 P. h. daksha Moore - South India. Not rare
 P. h. helenus Linnaeus - Mussoorie to Myanmar. Common
and one in Taiwan:
 P. h. fortunius Fruhstorfer, 1908

Life cycle

This butterfly flies throughout the year in southern India.

Eggs
The egg is pale apricot-yellow in colour when freshly deposited, spherical in shape and has a slightly roughened exterior which looks like the skin of an orange when seen through a microscope. The diameter of an egg is 1.2 mm.

The eggs are deposited singly on the tips of very young leaves and shoots in shady parts of thick jungle. Before hatching, the eggs appear to be marked by chocolate coloured lines and flecks. The egg hatches in 4 to 7 days.

Caterpillar
The freshly emerged larva is about 3 mm long. Throughout the caterpillar stage, if it is agitated it can evert a yellow-to-red osmeterium from the first segment, just behind the head. Each of the other segments bears, on the back, a pair of tufts of stiff hairs, each tuft arising from a small, yellowish conical process. The overall colour is brown, but there is a whitish saddle-like patch about the middle and the tail segments are also whitish in colour.

Like other Papilio species the larva can evert a two-pronged horn-like osmeterium when it is irritated. The osmeterium secretes an repugnatorial|unpleasant-smelling liquid which is believed to repel predators and parasites.

After the first moult the caterpillar has the appearance of a shiny bird dropping. The larva is grass green in colour, mottled black and white and smoky grey. The osmeterium, when everted, is generally yellow to red.

While inactive, mainly during daylight hours, the young larva lies along the midrib of the underside of the leaf. Later on, when it is largely fully grown, it is greener and lies on the centre of the upperside of the leaf, on a stem or a twig. The fifth instar larva is about 5 cm long.

See also
Papilionidae
List of butterflies of India
List of butterflies of India (Papilionidae)

References

External links
 

helenus
Butterflies of Asia
Butterflies described in 1758
Butterflies of Indochina
Taxa named by Carl Linnaeus